Thomas Blondeau (June 21, 1978 in Poperinge – October 20, 2013 in Poperinge) was a Flemish writer, poet and journalist. He studied literature at the University of Leuven and the University of Leiden. He wrote for newspapers including Mare, Deng, De Revisor, De Standaard and Dif .

Career 
After publishing poetry readings and short stories, he published his first novel, eX, which was well received in Belgium and the Netherlands. In early 2010 he published his second novel, Donderhart. In 2013, he published his third novel, Het West-Vlaams versierhandboek, which received positive reviews.

Thomas Blondeau died unexpectedly on October 20, 2013 of an aortic rupture in his hometown Poperinge.

Bibliography 
 eX, 2006, 351 blz., uitgeverij De Bezige Bij - Amsterdam, 
 Donderhart, 2010, 313 blz, uitgeverij De Bezige Bij - Amsterdam, 
 Het West-Vlaams versierhandboek, 2013, 252 blz., uitgeverij De Bezige Bij – Amsterdam,

References 

1978 births
2013 deaths
Belgian male writers
Dutch male writers
Flemish writers
KU Leuven alumni
Leiden University alumni